This is a list of cities and towns in Kenya.

Cities and towns in Kenya 

Baragoi
Bungoma
Busia
Butere
Dadaab
Diani Beach
Eldoret
Emali
Embu
Garissa
Gede
Hola
Homa Bay
Isiolo
Kitui
Kibwezi
Kajiado
Kakamega
Kakuma
Kapenguria

Kericho
Keroka
Kiambu
Kilifi
Kisii
Kisumu
Kitale
Lamu
Langata
Litein
Lodwar
Lokichoggio
Londiani
Loyangalani
Machakos
Makindu
Malindi
Mandera
Maralal
Marsabit
Meru
Mombasa
Moyale

Mumias
Muranga
Mutomo
Nairobi
Naivasha
Nakuru
Namanga
Nanyuki
Naro Moru
Narok
Nyahururu
Nyeri
Ruiru
Shimoni
Takaungu
Thika
Vihiga
Voi
Wajir
Watamu
Webuye
Wote
Wundanyi

See also 
List of cities and towns in Kenya by population
Local authorities of Kenya
History of Kenya
List of cities in East Africa

References 

 
Cities
Kenya
Kenya